Karl Meiler (30 April 1949 – 17 April 2014) was a tennis player from West Germany who was active in the 1970s and 1980s.

Meiler won four singles (1972, Buenos Aires; 1974, Omaha and Calgary; 1977, Manila) and 17 doubles titles during his professional career. He notably beat top seed Ken Rosewall in the 1973 Australian Open, where he went on to reach the semifinals. Meiler reached his highest singles ATP-ranking on 23 August 1973 when he became world No. 20. He died aged 64 on 17 April 2014 of complications from a head injury sustained in a domestic accident in November 2013.

ATP career finals

Singles: 17 (4 titles, 13 runner-ups)

Doubles: 24 (17 titles, 7 runner-ups)

References

External links
 
 
 

1949 births
2014 deaths
Sportspeople from Erlangen
West German male tennis players
Deaths from head injury
Tennis people from Bavaria